Cambridge Heath is an urban area of Bethnal Green in the London Borough of Tower Hamlets, approximately  north east of Charing Cross. It is named after a former heath in the East End of London. The northern boundary is formed by the Regent's Canal and the area includes Vyner Street, best known for its street art and galleries.

The area is served by Cambridge Heath railway station, operated by London Overground.

Toponymy
The earliest written use of the name was by a scribe in the era of great orthographic variety, as Camprichthesheth, in 1275; other manifold variations soon followed. It could be unconnected with Cambridge instead from an Old English plant (such as comfrey) or unusual-form man's name. The area was once marshland and forest which, as Bishopswood, lingered in the east until the 16th century.

History

The Bethnal Green gasworks in Cambridge Heath, named after the then-Metropolitan Borough of Bethnal Green were built in 1866 and 1889 by designer, John Clark. Prior to the 1960s the sites were used to manufacture and store town gas made from coal. Following the discovery of natural gas in the North Sea in the 1960s, the gas holders continued to be used to store natural gas.

The Wilkinson Gallery opened on Cambridge Heath Road in 1998 before moving to Vyner Street in 2007. The gallery became known as one of the first in London to have exhibitions by major female artists such as Joan Jonas, Dara Birnbaum and Laurie Simmons. However the Wilkinson Gallery closed in 2017.

By around 2005, Vyner Street had become a hub of the East London art scene. Between 2005 and 2008, the EEL established the Vyner Street Festival with the local Victory Pub as a family festival with local bands, artists and market traders, this has a different theme every year, with the Red Arrows performing flyover in 2008. By 2012, however, many artists had moved out due to the effects of the Great Recession as well as the 2012 Olympics. A documentary film was released in the same year titled Vyner Street: this was a short observational piece about two different worlds living inconspicuously and side by side in the same place.

Marco Canha and James Roach, established an academy in 2012 called the Fight Zone and it has the busiest martial arts schedule in Europe and internationally acclaimed coaches.

In 2015, Tower Hamlets Council took the owners of Al Amin Tandoori Restaurant to court after a routine inspection, which found mouse droppings throughout the kitchen. The owner Abdul Noor, pleaded guilty at Thames Magistrates Court to six charges including inadequate control of pests, contamination of equipment and contamination of food. Following an inspection on 28 March 2019 the Al Amin Tandoori Restaurant was given the highest Food Hygiene Rating of 5 (Very Good).

Cambridge Heath station was chosen in 2018 for a trial with a pay-by-face system that may end the need for station barriers, due to its low passenger volumes and having no gates.

Governance
Cambridge Heath is in the constituency of Bethnal Green and Bow represented by the Labour Party's Rushanara Ali (since 2010) in the House of Commons of the UK Parliament.
 
London overall has a directly elected, executive Mayor of London, currently Sadiq Khan with strong powers in transport, construction planning and long-term strategies. The mayor is scrutinised, and can be steered by the London Assembly; both Mayor and Assembly face regular elections. Its City and East seat is held by Labour's Unmesh Desai.

Honorary figure for London
London's Lord-Lieutenant Ken Olisa can be invited as personal representative for the monarch to key ceremonies but no has public policy or active operational role. Always consulting with the departmental office or local councils before opening buildings, the role is an honorary (titular) position.

Geography and Regents Canal Conservation Area

Cambridge Heath and Bethnal Green proper were unequal halves of the same manor, and in the 19th century both formed part of the Metropolitan Borough of Bethnal Green. This was incorporated into the newly created London Borough of Tower Hamlets in 1965.

It is north and west of Bethnal Green, east of Haggerston, south-west of Hackney and west of Victoria Park.

It is largely part of the wider Regents Canal Conservation Area, established in 2008, the streetside buildings seem neglected but form part of the industrial heritage and character of Vyner Street and also Wadeson Street, which contains a row of three-storey Victorian workshops mostly converted to residential use. Both types contribute to the character of the area.

Filmography
Gangster No. 1
Tinker Tailor Soldier Spy
Fast & Furious 6
Kingsman: The Secret Service

Public houses
The Hare is one of few public houses of Cambridge Heath opened before 1900. An ex-Truman establishment, it is now a free house. The Hare was described as the epitome of a 'good, honest pub' by the Evening Standard and listed as one of the best 50 in London in 2019.

Festivals and events
The Oval Space hosted the London's first catfest in 2018. This featured photography with felines; street food and shelter kittens.

Religious buildings
St Casimir's is the earliest church for London's Lithuanian Catholics and masses are held in Lithuanian and English. It was opened by Cardinal Bourne on 10 March 1912.

In the Church of England, west of the Overground railway is the parish of St Peter; the church is on its so-named Close and one-limb, remnant square opposite Ion Square Gardens. East of the viaduct, west of Russia Lane, is the north part of the parish of St John on Bethnal Green; east of Russia Lane and Wadeson Street is St James The Less.

Education

Cambridge Heath has Mowlem Primary School,

Martial arts
Jiu jitsu and other martial arts have a large size, professionally-taught club.

Transport
The neighbourhood main arterial route for motor vehicles and cyclists is the A107 Cambridge Heath Road from Mile End Gate in Stepney and Mare Street from Hackney Central which runs north–south from the two borough boundaries over the Regents Canal. Hackney Road is the main arterial road for Central London.

The Cat & Mutton Bridge spans over the Regents Canal, which still carries the name of a former alehouse which stood on the site at the extreme right, closed since at least 1919. The present pub on a new site was built in 1909 as the Sir Walter Scott but is now known as La Vie en Rose.

London Overground; Cambridge Heath railway station, opened on 27 May 1872 in the southern end of the neighbourhood, is served by Overground Enfield Town/Cheshunt-London Liverpool Street Line.

A number of London Buses contacted routes serve the area, the 26, 48, 55, N26, N55 on Hackney Road which in turn go towards Mare Street, while the 106, 254, 388, D6 and N253 run on Cambridge Heath Road and Mare Street. The D6 finishes and restarts near Ash Grove since 2014.

References

 
Geography of the London Borough of Tower Hamlets
Districts of the London Borough of Tower Hamlets
Areas of London
Bethnal Green
Places formerly in Middlesex